Ukrainian-American Concordia University (UACU) is a  located in the center of Kyiv, the capital of Ukraine.
Since 1997, Ukrainian-American Concordia University – ConcordiaUA – continues to be a leader in international higher education in Kyiv, Ukraine. ConcordiaUA will give you the tools and knowledge you need to make an impact on the world around you.

You will be taking classes, joining clubs, taking advantage of many informational resources from our partner universities from USA, Great Britain, Germany and more. Our students come from 50 countries.

ConcordiaUA is committed to providing an extraordinary education. We have an international faculty. Our students have access to Dual Diploma Programs with leading universities in Europe and the United States, accredited by international organizations.

Learn management and broaden your horizons through liberal arts and languages. Courses in all degree programs are designed to enable you to challenge yourself intellectually and acquire skills for a high-profile international career, understand diverse cultures, management contexts and approaches.

Accreditation
Ukrainian-American Concordia University is licensed and accredited by the Ministry of Education and Science of Ukraine and the State Accrediting Board of Ukraine to offer Bachelor and Master Programs.

UACU’s License is termless (refer to the Law of Ukraine).

Information on Providing Higher Education Activities:

Information on the Right of Higher Education Activities Provision by Ukrainian-American Concordia University is published on the Site of the Ministry of Education and Science of Ukraine.

FIBAA Accreditation

On September 27, 2012 the MBA program at the Ukrainian-American Concordia University was accredited and on July 6, 2018 re-accredited by the Foundation for International Business Administration Accreditation (FIBAA) agency, which is strongly respected in the world business and academic circles.

The purpose of FIBAA is to promote the quality and transparency in education and science by awarding quality certificates to educational programs and educational institutions in the areas of higher education and continued professional development. This accreditation organization is recognized in Europe and, furthermore, by the US Council for Higher Education Accreditation. Many well-known universities in the world have FIBAA accreditation.

The fact that UACU received FIBAA accreditation is a signature of the highest quality of its MBA program. Practical benefits that MBA graduates can receive are numerous, including increased opportunities in employment and continued education in Europe and the USA.

The BBA program in Management and International Business at the Ukrainian-American Concordia University was accredited by FIBAA on July 11, 2014 and on May 28, 2021 re-accredited by the  Foundation for International Business Administration Accreditation (FIBAA) agency.

History
Concordia Ukraine was established in 1997 as Ukrainian-American Liberal Arts Institute “Wisconsin International University Ukraine”.

In 2017, our longterm partner Concordia University Wisconsin / Ann Arbor became the official co-founder of the Ukrainian-American Concordia University. For us it is a great honor that our co-founder agreed to use the word-symbol Concordia in our new name! The meaning of the word Concordia – consensus, agreement, peace – is gaining more and more importance and weight in the historical development of the world, countries, society and individual.

ConcordiaUA is licensed and accredited by the Ministry of Education and Science of Ukraine and the State Accrediting Board of Ukraine, as well as by the International Accrediting Board FIBAA, to offer Bachelor and Master Programs on site and distantly for Ukrainian and international students, as well as In-Service Training and Preparatory Department Programs.

Degree Programs

Bachelor Programs

Our bachelor’s degree programs are ideally balanced against the number of subjects taught and their information content as they combine general education in various business subjects with specialized training according to the chosen major/minor. All of our educational programs are complemented by internships, workshops, business projects, and the opportunity to participate in international academic mobility programs.

Speciality: 073 Management

Educational programs
 Management
 IT Management
 Business Administration in Management and International Business

Speciality: 292 International Economic Relations

Educational programs
 International Economic Relations
 International Business

Master/MBA Program

Ukrainian-American Concordia University is proud to offer you to achieve a master’s degree in Business Administration. The fundamental advantage of our University is an individual approach to each student and care for their personal success. The modern American education model guarantees that our students obtain the full scope of knowledge relevant for application in the business sphere, which will result in fast development of your professional skills.

Speciality: 073 Management

Educational program

 Business Administration

Ph.D. in Economics Program

The main focus of the program is conducting scientific research in the field of economics and writing doctoral thesis. Areas of specialization include sustainable economics, natural resource and environmental protection economics, economics and business management, etc.

Speciality: 051 Economics

Educational Program

 Economics

Partner Universities from abroad
We believe in the power of strategic partnerships to create positive impact. We are greatly enhanced by our alliances with leading institutions, companies, academic institutions, organizations, media, NGOs, and student organizations that share our vision and purpose to create a better future.

 Concordia University Wisconsin / Ann Arbor (USA)
 University of Minnesota Crookston (USA)
 Rutgers University, USA
 East Central University (Ada, Oklahoma, USA)
 Schiller International University (USA-Great Britain-Germany-France-Spain)
 Richmond, The American International University in London (Great Britain)
 Trier University (Germany)
 Ukrainian Free University (Germany)
 University of Applied Sciences, Worms (Germany)
 University of Koblenz and Landau (Germany)
 Bahçeşehir University (Turkey)
 Varna University of Management (Bulgaria)
 Kazakh-American Free University (Kazakhstan)

Partner organizations and institutions from Ukraine and abroad

 The Council for Higher Education Accreditation / International Quality Group – CHEA-CIQG, USA
 Precedent Academics, USA
 Co-Serve International, Oregon, USA
 German-Ukrainian Society for Economics and Science (DUG WW; Berlin, Bonn, Mainz)
 SocialBoost, Kyiv, Ukraine
 US Peace Corps in Ukraine
 Fulbright Program
 Pearson Education
 Ukrainian Chamber of Commerce and Industry, Ukraine
 Kyiv City Chamber of Commerce and Industry, Ukraine
 Diamond FMS, Netherlands – Ukraine
 Union of Entrepreneurs of Small, Medium and Privatized Enterprises of Ukraine
 OVB Holding AG, Cologne, Germany
 Horizon Leadership Group, LLC, USA
 Blagomay Charity Foundation, Kyiv, Ukraine
 Kyiv Palace of Children and Youth
 Joint Stock Company Obolon, Kyiv, Ukraine

Student life
The Student Council of the Ukrainian-American Concordia University helps students become responsible and active members of the community.
The Student Council as the voice of students helps share ideas, interests, and students’ concerns with the Professors, Deans and the Rector.
During the year, ConcordiaUA organizes a range of on- and off-campus cultural, social and educational events, recreational activities, and sporting events:

 Scientific conferences and research activities
 Meetings with businessmen, politicians, and diplomats
 Business workshops and master classes
 Language competitions and olympiads
 Internships at international Ukrainian and foreign companies, the Ukrainian Chamber of Commerce and Industry, and the Kyiv Chamber of Commerce and Industry
 Dual diploma and exchange programs
 Sport competitions and athletic tournaments
 Sightseeing tours, excursions and field trips
 Picnics and celebrations

Honorable doctors and professors
The university's academic program is supported by a body of lecturers from various fields. In addition, WIUU regularly gives students the opportunity to learn from guest lecturers, honorary doctors and professors. Among these are:
 Karl Beck, former director of the US Peace Corps
 Jörn Block, professor at University of Trier, Germany
 Hansjürgen Doss, honorary consul of Ukraine
 Douglas Gardner, former United Nations coordinator in Ukraine
 Axel Haas, lecturer at Trier University, Germany
 John Herbst, former US Ambassador to Ukraine
 Moritz Hunzinger, PR and communications specialist
 Adalbert Lhota, former honorary consul general of Austria
 Michael Ruiss, Entrepreneur and publisher of TOP Magazine Frankfurt Rhine-Main, Germany
 Stephan Schupbach, professor at Frankfurt University of Applied Sciences
 Peter Spary, secretary general of German-Ukrainian association for economy and science
 Dietmar Stüdemann, former ambassador of Germany
 Gert-René Polli, Former Head of the Austrian Internal Security Service: Bundesamt für Verfassungsschutz und Terrorismusbekämpfung
 Anastasiia Tsybuliak, Professor of the Department of International Economics, Business and Management. Doctor of Economic Sciences, PhD in Political Sciences
 Joachim Bentz, Marketing Director of the international corporation Imperial Tobacco Ukraine
 Jeff Evans, Top salesman at Roche Laboratories and AstraZeneca

External links
 University Website
 Ukrainian-American Concordia University - WIUU on Facebook
 UACU - Concordia University on Instagram
 Ukrainian-American Concordia University on Youtube

Sources

1997 establishments in Ukraine
Educational institutions established in 1997
Universities in Ukraine